This is a list of all seasons played by FK Radnički Niš in domestic and European football, from 1945 to the most recent completed season.

This list details the club's achievements in all major competitions, and the top scorers for each season (note that only goals scored in league matches are taken into account).

The tables below provide a summary of the club's performance by season in all official competitions, including domestic leagues, cups and European club competitions.

Seasons

SFR Yugoslavia era (1945–1992)

FR Yugoslavia / Serbia and Montenegro era (1992–2006)

Serbia era (2006–present)

Notes
 Between the 1988–89 and 1991–92 season drawn games went to penalties with only the shootout winners gaining a point. Figures in brackets in the drawn games column represent points won in such shootouts.
 In the 1946–47 season, Radnički was competed under the part of 14. Oktobar Niš.
 Between the 1993–94 and 1997–98 season, the league was divided into 2 groups, A and B, consisting each of 10 clubs. Both groups were played in league system. By winter break all clubs in each group met each home and away, with the bottom four from A group moving to the group B, and being replaced by the top four from the B group. At the end of the season the same situation happened with four teams being replaced from A and B groups. The final placing are listed with a combined results of both groups.

References

 Official website 

Seasons
Radnički Niš